Shuvoda is a 1986 Bangladeshi Bengali language film directed by Chashi Nazrul Islam from Sarat Chandra Chattopadhyay's novel of the same name.

Plot
Haran (Golam Mustafa) family consists of his wife Shuvoda (Anwara), two daughters - Lolona and Chholona, one son Madhab, and a widowed sister. Lolona becomes widowed after one month of marriage and is sent back to her father's home. Haran is addicted to gambling and lives from hand to mouth.

Cast
 Anwara - Shuvoda
 Golam Mustafa - Haran
 Bulbul Ahmed - Zaminder
 Razzak - Sodanondo
 Jinat - Lolona

Soundtrack
The music of this film was directed by Khondokar Nurul Alam and the lyrics were penned by Mohammad Rafiquzzaman and Nazrul Islam Babu. Nilufar Yasmin, Sabina Yasmin, Subir Nandi and Nazmul Huda sang in this film.
 Eto Sukh Soibe Kemon Kore - Nilufar Yasmin

Awards

References

1986 films
1980s Bengali-language films
Bengali-language Bangladeshi films
Films based on Indian novels
Films scored by Khandaker Nurul Alam
Best Film National Film Award (Bangladesh) winners